Ferber Peak is a summit in Elko County, Nevada.

References

Mountains of Elko County, Nevada